Ernest Reginald Ridgway (1852 - 19 July 1917) was an English architect based in Long Eaton.

Career
He was born in 1852 in Cheltenham, Gloucestershire, the son of William Ridgway (1819-1903) and Mary.

He married Mary Eliza Sketchley (1851-1904) in 1875 in Nottingham. On the death of his first wife in 1904, he married Louisa Goodwin Sketchley (1865-1926) on 5 November 1906 at St Heliers Parish Church, Jersey.

From 1893 to 1899 he had as his assistant John Frederick Dodd who later set up his own practice in Long Eaton, Derbyshire.

Until 1908 he worked in partnership with James Garfield Smith.

He died on 19 July 1917 at his home, 11, Lenton Road, The Park Estate, Nottingham. He left an estate valued at £13,129.

Notable works

References

1852 births
1917 deaths
Architects from Gloucestershire
People from Cheltenham